It Was a Home is the second studio album by American singer and songwriter KAINA, which was released worldwide on March 4, 2022, through City Slang. The album was supported by five singles: "Come Back as a Flower", "Casita", "Anybody Can Be In Love", "Apple", and "Golden Mirror". The album features Sen Morimoto, Sleater-Kinney, and Helado Negro.

Release and promotion 
KAINA announced the album on November 2, 2021, the same day when she released her third single, Anybody Can Be In Love. She also revealed an upcoming tour with tour dates in North America and in Europe. The sophomore album was released on March 4, 2022, with a limited vinyl pressing in sun yellow and violet.

Singles 
On August 9, 2021, KAINA did a cover of "Come Back as a Flower" by Stevie Wonder from his album Journey Through the Secret Life of Plants with a music video. This cover was considered the first single of KAINA's second studio album. On September 15, she released the second single, "Casita". The third single, "Anybody Can Be In Love", was released with the announcement of the second studio album. "Apple" was the third single, released on January 19, 2022. The final single, "Golden Mirror", was released on March 6, 2022.

Tour 

It Was a Home Tour is the ongoing concert tour by American singer KAINA, in support of It Was a Home. It was her first headlining concert tour. The North American tour commenced on March 16 and is set to conclude on July 17, 2022. The tour would've included a European leg but it ended up postponed or cancelled due to unknown reasons. Helado Negro supported on selected dates on the tour.

Reception 

On her soulful second album that reconciles childhood memories and future dreams, Gio Santiago of Pitchfork referred to the album as "a soothing progression from her debut and a soulful ode to the city and the relationships that have nourished KAINA’s life".

For Loud and Quiet, Sam Walton says "you’ll be hard-pressed to find a warmer, more welcoming collection of understated, open-hearted soul music this year".

Track listing 
All tracks are written by KAINA and Sen Morimoto except track 7, which was written by Stevie Wonder and Syreeta Wright.

Release history

References 

2022 albums
Alternative R&B albums
Pop albums by American artists
Latin alternative albums
Chicago soul albums
Soul albums by American artists
Latin music albums by American artists